Gubernatorial Election in Novgorod Oblast were held on 10 September 2017.

Background
13 February 2017 Governor Sergey Mitin announced early resignation and that he will not nominate his candidacy for a new term. Acting Governor appointed Andrey Nikitin.

Candidates
Candidates on the ballot:

Opinion polls

Result

See also
2017 Russian gubernatorial elections

References

2017 elections in Russia
2017 Russian gubernatorial elections
Politics of Novgorod Oblast